Appeal For Courage is an appeal by United States military personnel in favor of the Iraq War to the United States Congress.

The group is independent and non-partisan, but supported by Families United for Our Troops and their Mission, Vets for Freedom, and Military Families Voice of Victory. It was established in February 2007 largely as a response to the Appeal for Redress.

The group solicits members of the U.S. military to support an appeal to the U.S. Congress:

The appeal with over 2700 names was delivered by Bob Wallace, executive director of Veterans of Foreign Wars, to Congressman John Boehner, Senator Lindsey Graham, and five other members of Congress on May 9, 2007.

References

External links
 An Appeal for Courage, Group Website

Political advocacy groups in the United States
Veterans' organizations in favor of the Iraq War
Stances and opinions regarding the Iraq War
2007 in the United States